The fourth series of the British comedy drama television series Cold Feet was aired on the ITV network from 18 November to 10 December 2001. Eight episodes were broadcast over four weeks and the final episode was extended to 72 minutes. The plot of the series follows Adam (James Nesbitt) and Rachel (Helen Baxendale) trying to have children, the fallout between Karen (Hermione Norris) and David (Robert Bathurst) after his affair, and the departure of Jenny (Fay Ripley). Kimberley Joseph is introduced as Jo Ellison, the new woman in Pete's (John Thomson) life; their fast-developing romance leads to their marriage in the eighth episode, set in Sydney.

The series went through a series of schedule changes, as ITV attempted to rebrand its weekday output, and episodes were broadcast on two consecutive nights of the week. The final episode won Cold Feet the BAFTA for Best Drama Series.

Episodes

Production
The final episode of the third series drew 9.1 million viewers, the highest audience figure for the programme. By then the fourth series was already in pre-production, and it was decided by the production crew and the cast that the show should end after the fourth to stop it from "going stale". Fay Ripley left Cold Feet during this series, not wishing to spend months away from her home filming the series. She believed Jenny had nowhere left to go in terms of character development, having already given birth to a child and separated from Pete. During the development stage of this series, she encouraged Bullen to write Jenny out by severely maiming her, though they both came to the agreement that Jenny would take a job in New York, leaving open the possibility that she could return in the future. To fill Ripley's place in the cast, the producers scouted for a new actress. Spencer Campbell went to Los Angeles and auditioned former Home and Away actress Kimberley Joseph, who was looking for work in America. Campbell soon hired her as Jo Ellison. Bullen had originally planned for Jo to be a "big fat truck-driving lesbian type", but the character was toned down when he met Joseph. Victoria Smurfit reprised her role as Jane Fitzpatrick for two episodes, while Sean Pertwee joined the series in the recurring role of Mark Cubbit for the last four episodes. Baxendale did not appear in the sixth episode, filmed in July and August; she took time off filming during the late stage of her pregnancy. Rachel's absence was explained away by having her visiting Jenny in New York.

Despite it being established in the third series that Rachel was unable to conceive a child because of her abortion, Helen Baxendale's pregnancy meant a "twist" was needed in the plot, and the apparently miraculous conception was worked into the storyline. Initially, the pregnancy was to be revealed in the sixth episode, but when Baxendale began showing early, the plot was moved forward by two episodes. Bullen wrote a scene showing the social worker crying after turning down Adam and Rachel's adoption application to show a positive portrayal of the profession, against what appeared in media at the time. While taking advantage of the location for filming, the eighth episode was written as a normal episode "about [the] characters who happened to be in Australia". The breakup of the Giffords' and Marsdens' marriages allowed Bullen to combine different characters in scenes who aren't often seen together, in particular the third episode, which saw Pete and Karen clubbing together. By this series Bullen was writing the characters as more like the actors who played them, compared to basing them on his friends as he did when Cold Feet began.

Filming was scheduled between April and October 2001, though did not begin until late May. Spencer Campbell produced episodes 1–3 and 7–8 and Emma Benson, a script supervisor on previous series, produced the other four. Between the third and fourth series, Bullen and Harries did a speaking tour in the Far East and Australia, where they decided to work a trip to Sydney into the storyline for no reason other than it was "a nice place to go". The main cast, Pertwee and a skeleton production crew were flown out to Sydney to film on location, filming for 18 days in Sydney in October 2001. A local film crew was hired as flying the regular production crew to Australia would have been prohibitively expensive. A stunt team co-ordinated the fight scene between Mark and David, but could not convincingly choreograph a headbutt between Mark and David. Pertwee, already experienced in stunt fighting, and the stunt coordinator agreed Pertwee would get a better reaction from Bathurst by almost hitting him straight on his face, instead of "hitting air". Bad scheduling meant the time for filming in Manchester ran out, so scenes depicting the characters at Manchester Airport were shot in Sydney. Banners promoting the 2002 Commonwealth Games were hung up for authenticity. Scenes featuring Rachel's hotel room were shot at the Lowry Hotel in Salford, while the exteriors used the GMEX Centre.

Broadcast
In an effort to draw the ABC1 demographic to Sunday nights, ITV's director of channels David Liddiment moved the series from Sunday to Monday, replacing it with two "upmarket" dramas. Shortly before the first episode was broadcast, it was rescheduled to both Sunday and Monday nights to compete with a BBC costume drama and Dalziel and Pascoe.

Reception
The first episode had 8.9 million viewers, beating a BBC One adaptation of The Way We Live Now. Episodes shown on Monday had lower ratings than the Sunday episodes, averaging only 6.9 million, due to the scheduling of the game show Shafted as a lead-in. ITV moved Who Wants to Be a Millionaire? to Shafted's timeslot and Cold Feet's ratings picked up, with the eighth episode getting 8.5 million and a 37% share. The fifth episode was the series highest rated episode, with final ratings of 9.87 million, making it the 13th most-watched drama of the year.

Comparing the series to The Way We Live Now, Andrew Billen wrote in the Evening Standard that Cold Feet was "the real way we live now", citing the emotional relationships in the series as examples of real-life behaviour. Despite this, the series was regarded as not on par with previous ones; Billen wrote in New Statesman that the series was "running on half a tank" and James Nesbitt said it "wasn't great".

The series was awarded the BAFTA for Best Drama Series for the wedding episode and Most Popular Comedy Programme at the National Television Awards. The scene in which Pete meets Rod for the first time was voted "Best Dramatic Moment" at the BBC's annual "TV Moments" ceremony in 2002.

Home media 
The series was rated by the British Board of Film Classification on 5 September 2002, with episodes 1–6 and 8 receiving a 12 rating and episode 7 a 15. Cold Feet: The Complete 4th Series was released on region 2 DVD by VCI on 25 November 2002. and was re-released in new packaging by Granada Media on 20 March 2006. A DVD of the eighth episode was made available in 2003 in a joint promotional venture between the Sunday Mirror and Woolworths.

References 

Smith, Rupert (2003). Cold Feet: The Complete Companion. London: Granada Media. .

Further reading
Smith, Greg M. (2006). "A Case of Cold Feet: Serial Narration and the Character Arc" (subscription access). Journal of British Cinema and Television (Edinburgh University Press) 3 (1): pp. 82–94. doi:10.3366/JBCTV.2006.3.1.82.
Staff (23 May 2001). "'Cold Feet' shoots in Oz". Encore Magazine (RBI Australia).

2001 British television seasons